Triatoma nigromaculata is a sylvatic species of insect usually found in hollow trees, in vertebrate nests on trees and occasionally in human dwellings. It usually lives in relatively humid forests at high altitudes on mountain regions and foot hills (300 to 1700 m above sea level). As all members of the subfamily Triatominae, T. nigromaculata is a blood-sucking bug and a potential vector of Chagas disease. This species is distributed mainly in Venezuela (Aragua, Barinas, Bolívar, Cojedes, Delta Amacuro, Distrito Capital, Lara, Mérida, Monagas, Portuguesa, Sucre and Yaracuy), but some specimens have also been found in Perú and Colombia (Cauca).

References 

 Añez N, Crisante1 G, Rojas A, Néstor D,  Silverio D, Lizano E, Superlano Y, Aldana E (2006) Domiciliación de Triatoma nigromaculata de la región Montana del sur de Mérida, Venezuela. BOLETÍN DE MALARIOLOGÍA Y SALUD AMBIENTAL Vol. XLV, Nº 1
 Heger T (2004) Adaptations comportementales et importances des conditions microclimatiques chez deux espèces de Triatominae (Hemiptera: Reduviidae) pour le maintien de leur balances hydriques: Rhodnius prolixus (Stal, 1859) et Triatoma nigromaculata (Stal, 1872). Université de Neuchâtel
 Reinel Vásquez L, Galvão C, Pinto NA, Granados H (2005) Primer registro de Triatoma nigromaculata (Stål, 1859) (Hemiptera, Reduviidae, Triatominae) para Colombia. Biomédica 25:417-21

Reduviidae
Insect vectors of human pathogens
Endemic fauna of Venezuela
Insects described in 1859